Gymnastics at the 2013 Games of the Small States of Europe was held from 28–30 May 2013 in Stade Josy Barthel, Luxembourg.

Medal summary

Medal table

Men

Women

References

External links
 Site of the 2013 Games of the Small States of Europe 
 Result book

2013 in gymnastics
2013 Games of the Small States of Europe
Gymnastics at the Games of the Small States of Europe